Belfast Exposed is a photography gallery in  Belfast, established in 1983. It was Northern Ireland's first dedicated photographic gallery and in 2018 Sean O'Hagan in The Guardian described it as "the key independent space for contemporary photography" there. Belfast Exposed houses a 20×7 m gallery for the exhibition of contemporary photography, digital archive browsing facilities, a spacious black and white photographic darkroom and a digital editing suite in its Donegall Street premises.

It was established "to challenge and subvert media representations of the Troubles-torn city". The gallery has focused on the production of socially and politically engaged work, the development and exhibition of community photography. Training is used to encourage local communities to use photography to record and understand their environment.

Belfast Exposed hosts an archive of half a million images, which were to be published online in a digital archive by March 2004.

The gallery is used as a venue during both the Belfast Film Festival and the Belfast Festival at Queen's.

References

External links

Culture in Belfast
Buildings and structures in Belfast
Art museums and galleries in Northern Ireland
Photography museums and galleries in Northern Ireland
Tourist attractions in Belfast
Art galleries established in 1983
1983 establishments in Northern Ireland